John Andrew Pearson (June 22, 1867 – June 11, 1940) was an early 20th-century British-born Canadian architect and partner to the Toronto-based firm of Darling and Pearson.

Early life and education
Pearson was born in Chesterfield, UK. His father John Pearson (1831-1906) was a builder and stonemason in Sheffield. After attending Wesley College, Pearson worked as a stonemason for his father from 1885 to 1887 before emigrating to Canada in 1888.

Career

Pearson worked for Henry Sproatt beginning in 1890, and joined Darling, Curry, Sproatt, & Pearson in 1892, with fellow partners Frank Darling and S. George Curry.  Curry departed, and from 1893 through 1896 that office was known as Darling, Sproatt & Pearson.

In 1896 Sproatt left the partnership, and the firm was renamed Darling and Pearson.  This partnership lasted from 1897 through Pearson's death in 1940.

Pearson was the first Vice-President of Ontario Association of Architects (1902).

Pearson's most significant project apart from this partnership is undoubtedly the Centre Block on Parliament Hill in Ottawa, a complex that contains the House of Commons of Canada and Senate of Canada, and the adjoining Peace Tower.

The previous Centre Block burned in 1916, entirely destroyed except for the Library of Parliament.  By 1920 the Centre Block was rebuilt with a design by Pearson and collaborator Jean Omer Marchand of Montreal.  The Peace Tower commemorating the end of the First World War was completed in 1927.

In 1928 Pearson was commissioned to design a building, with noted New York architects York and Sawyer, to house the head office of the Canadian Bank of Commerce in Toronto.  The 34-story building was completed in 1931 in spite of the onset of the Great Depression, and at the time was the tallest building in the British Empire.

Death
Pearson died in Toronto in 1940, aged 72. He is buried at Mount Pleasant Cemetery.

Works

See also

 Henry Sproatt - partnered with Pearson from 1890 to 1896

References

External links
 JA Pearson
 John A Pearson at The Canadian Encyclopedia
 Darling and Pearson
 Historic Places in Canada

1867 births
1940 deaths
Canadian architects
Architects from Derbyshire
People from Chesterfield, Derbyshire
People from Old Toronto
British emigrants to Canada
Burials at Mount Pleasant Cemetery, Toronto
People educated at Wesley College, Sheffield